Hugo Meurer (28 May 1869 – 4 January 1960) was a vice-admiral of the Kaiserliche Marine (German Imperial Navy). Meurer was the German naval officer who handled the negotiations of the internment of the German fleet in November 1918 at the end of the First World War.

Life
Meurer was born in Sallach in Carinthia. On 16 April 1886 he joined the Kaiserliche Marine.

In 1917 he was promoted to the rank of rear-admiral (Konteradmiral), as the second Admiral of the 4th Battle Squadron of the High Seas Fleet, which he remained until the end of the war.

From 21 February to 2 May 1918, as commander of the special unit (Sonderverband) of the Baltic Sea, he led the naval expedition for the German intervention in the ongoing civil war in Finland. In November 1918 Meurer negotiated as representative of Admiral Franz von Hipper with Admiral David Beatty the details of the surrender of the German fleet.

Meurer was also the naval station commander of the Baltic, based in Kiel. He retired in 1920 with the rank of vice-admiral of the Reichsmarine.

Notes

External links 

 World War I Document Archive: Commanders of the High Seas Fleet Battle Squadrons 1914-1918
 Australian Navy: Semaphore, issue 14, Nov 2008 - "1918, Victory at sea"
 Short biography, with photo of Meurer's gravestone 

1869 births
1960 deaths
People from Styria
Vice admirals of the Imperial German Navy
Vice admirals of the Reichsmarine
Recipients of the Iron Cross (1914), 1st class
People of the Finnish Civil War (White side)
Commanders of the Order of Saints Maurice and Lazarus
German expatriates in Finland